Ilemi may refer to: 

The Ilemi Triangle, sometimes called only Ilemi, an area of disputed land between Kenya and South Sudan
The Ilemi Mbeya ward, an administrative ward in the Mbeya Urban district of the Mbeya Region in Tanzania